Melanella attenuata is a species of sea snail, a marine gastropod mollusk in the family Eulimidae. The species is one of many species known to exist within the genus, Melanella.

Distribution

This species occurs off the following locations:
 Madagascar
 Western Australia

References

 Iredale, T. 1914. Report on Mollusca collected at the Monte Bello Islands. Proceedings of the Zoological Society of London 1914: 665-675, 3 text figs
 Cotton, B.C. 1957. Records of uncommon southern Australian Mollusca. Records of the South Australian Museum (Adelaide) 13(1): 117-130

External links
 To World Register of Marine Species

attenuata
Gastropods described in 1866